A fish factory, also called a fish plant, fish processing facility, is a facility where fish processing is performed. Fish factories range in the size and range of species of fish they process. Some species of fish, such as mackerel and herring, and can be caught at sea by large pelagic trawlers and offloaded to the factory within a few days of being caught. Or the fish can be caught by freezer trawlers that freeze the fish before providing it to factories, or by factory ships which can do the processing themselves on board. Some fish factories have fishing vessels catching fish for them at a given times of the year. This is to do with quotas and seasons conflicting how much and when the fish can be landed.

Gallery

See also
 Cannery Row
 Factory ship
 Fish company
 Gulf of Georgia Cannery
 List of harvested aquatic animals by weight

References
 Garrity-Blake, Barbara J  (1994) The Fish Factory: Work and Meaning for Black and White Fishermen of the American Menhaden Industry University of Tennessee Press. 
 http://p2pays.org/ref/24/23296/f_chp2.pdf
 https://web.archive.org/web/20160409141334/http://www.radialnutrition.com/50-fish-oil-facts/
 https://web.archive.org/web/20120328080524/http://www.mdi-nepal.org/case4.html
 https://web.archive.org/web/20110728003506/http://dare.co.in/opportunities/agriculture-rural/fresh-water-fish-farming.htm

External links
 The fish factory

Fish processing